Nikita Olegovich Denisov (born 7 April 1986) is a former Russian professional football player.

Club career
He made his debut for FC Lokomotiv Moscow on 12 November 2005 in a Russian Cup game against FC Metallurg-Kuzbass Novokuznetsk.

He played 3 seasons in the Russian Football National League for FC Zvezda Irkutsk, FC Rostov and FC Vityaz Podolsk.

External links
 
 

1986 births
Living people
Russian footballers
Russia under-21 international footballers
Association football defenders
FC Lokomotiv Kaluga players
FC Lokomotiv Moscow players
FC Zvezda Irkutsk players
FC Rostov players
FC Vityaz Podolsk players